Tenellia perca, common name Lake Merritt cuthona, is a species of sea slug, an aeolid nudibranch, a marine gastropod mollusk in the family Fionidae.

References

Fionidae
Gastropods described in 1958